The 2016-17 Argentine Primera B Metropolitana was the 118th season of the third tier of football in Argentina. The season began on 26 August and will end in May 2017. Nineteen teams will compete in the league.

League table

Deportivo Morón is the champion of the 2016–17 Primera B Metropolitana at 34th week.

Playoffs

Quarterfinals

Semifinals

|}

Finals

|}

See also
 2016–17 Argentine Primera División
 2016–17 Primera B Nacional
 2016–17 Torneo Federal A
 2016–17 Copa Argentina

References

External links
soccerway.com

Primera B Metropolitana
Primera B Metropolitana seasons